Potlatch was a steamship which was operated on Hood Canal from 1912 to 1917, on Puget Sound from 1917 to 1937, although the vessel was little used after 1917.

Design and construction
Following the loss of the nearly-new but wooden steamship Clallam in 1904, Joshua Green, president of the Puget Sound Navigation Company, owner of the Clallam and the dominant Puget Sound shipping concern, announced that the company would replace its wooden steamships with ones built of steel.  As part of this effort, the steel steamers  Potlatch and Sol Duc were built simultaneously in Seattle by the Seattle Construction and Drydock Company.  Potlatch was specifically designed for the Seattle – Hood Canal route.

Steam was generated by two oil-fired boilers at 200 pounds (per square inch) pressure, with the overall power plant generating .

Operation
Potlatch replaced the old sternwheeler State of Washington on the Hood Canal route.  In 1917, Puget Sound Navigation Co. terminated its Hood Canal service, and Potlatch was sold.

Disposition
Potlatch was little used following the termination of the Hood Canal service and its sale.  In 1937, Potlatch was sold by the Georgia Company, a Puget Sound towing company, to Otis Shively who was doing business as the Shively Tow Boat Company.  In 1938 the vessel was scrapped.

Notes

References 
 Newell, Gordon R., ed., H.W. McCurdy Marine History of the Pacific Northwest,  Superior Publishing Co., Seattle, WA (1966)
 Newell, Gordon R., Ships of the Inland Sea, Superior Publishing Co., Seattle, WA (2nd Ed. 1960)

1912 ships
Steamboats of Washington (state)
History of Mason County, Washington
Propeller-driven steamboats of Washington (state)
Puget Sound Navigation Company
Ships built in Seattle